Helen Culver, known by her stage name Carmen Reece, is an English singer, songwriter, musician and producer based in Los Angeles, California. An accomplished pianist and flautist from childhood, Carmen penned her first song aged 11 and has since worked and written for artists such as Ariana Grande, Kanye West, Craig David, Destiny Rogers, Samantha Jade, and Nathan Sykes. Reece also has provided background vocals, vocal production, and vocal arrangement for artists. Her debut album Love in Stereo was released in 2010 and her debut EP was released in 2020.

Early life
Reece was born and raised in London. As a child, she played the flute and piano, participated in ballet and tap dancing, and practiced singing and songwriting. She graduated from the BRIT School.

Career
Reece began her music career with singles in England, and songwriting for other artists. She eventually met songwriter Mark J. Feist, who brought her to Los Angeles to help build her music career. Her first singles were titled "How Freaky Can You Get" and "You Got Me," both released in the UK. Her first album Love in Stereo was released in the summer of 2010, co-written with Feist. The album was released independently, through Feist's own label Real MF LTD. "Right Here" was released as the lead single. The song reached No. 3 in the US on the Dance/Mix Show Airplay chart.

In 2014, Carmen signed her first publishing deal to Universal Music under Donna Caseine and mid 2019 signed her second deal to UMPG. She has worked with writers and producers including Rodney Jerkins, Harmony Samuels, Tommy Brown, Tricky Stewart, Stereotypes, RedOne, Carole Bayer Sager, Fraser T. Smith and R. City. She formed a production partnership with fellow musician PK in late 2019 called ShrekpoPPins.

In the end of 2018, Reece released the first single called "Friday" from her upcoming 80's-pop self-titled album. The second single, "Say It," was released in early 2019. Eventually, the album was renamed as Evoke and was released as her debut EP in May 2020.

Songwriting credits

Vocal production

References

Year of birth missing (living people)
Living people
English women singer-songwriters
British contemporary R&B singers
Singers from London
21st-century English women singers
21st-century English singers